The Lygaeoidea are a sizeable superfamily of true bugs, containing seed bugs and allies, in the order Hemiptera. There are about 16 families and more than 4,600 described species in Lygaeoidea, found worldwide. Most feed on seeds or sap, but a few are predators.

The ash-gray leaf bug family (Piesmatidae) is generally considered a member of the superfamily Lygaeoidea, but in the past it was sometimes placed in its own superfamily.

Families
These 16 families belong to the superfamily Lygaeoidea. The majority of them were considered to be part of the family Lygaeidae before Thomas J. Henry's work was published in 1997.

 Artheneidae Stål, 1872
 Berytidae Fieber, 1851 (stilt bugs)
 Blissidae Stål, 1862
 Colobathristidae Stal, 1865
 Cryptorhamphidae
 Cymidae Baerensprung, 1860
 Geocoridae Baerensprung, 1860 (big-eyed bugs)
 Heterogastridae Stål, 1872
 Lygaeidae Schilling, 1829 (seed bugs)
 Malcidae Stål, 1865
 Meschiidae Malipatil, 2013
 Ninidae Barber, 1956
 Oxycarenidae Stål, 1862
 Pachygronthidae Stål, 1865
 Piesmatidae Amyot & Audinet-Serville, 1843 (ash-gray leaf bugs)
 Rhyparochromidae Amyot & Serville, 1843 (dirt-colored seed bugs)

References

External links

 

 
Hemiptera superfamilies